Ashelman Run is a tributary of Coles Creek in Columbia County, Pennsylvania, in the United States. The stream is designated as a Coldwater Fishery. It is named after Daniel Ashelman, who lived in the area in the early 1800s. Glacial till and other geological features can be found in the vicinity of the stream. It has one unnamed tributary and there are two lakes in the watershed.

Course
Ashelman Run begins in a large pond in Sugarloaf Township, on the southern base of Central Mountain. It flows southwest for several hundred feet, crossing Pennsylvania Route 118. The stream then turns south-southeast. After a few tenths of a mile, it receives an unnamed tributary from the left. Some distance further downstream, the stream reaches its confluence with Coles Creek.

Tributaries
Ashelman Run has no named tributaries. However, it does have one unnamed tributary.

Geography, geology, and watershed

For most of its length, Ashelman Run flows over a glacial till known as the Wisconsinan Till. However, the stream's lower reaches are on alluvium containing stratified silt, sand, and gravel. The stream also passes through a small patch of fill near its headwaters, where it crosses Pennsylvania Route 118. The Wisconsinan Till Moraine occurs a short distance north of its headwaters.

The stream is entirely in the United States Geological Survey quadrangle of Red Rock. It is located in northeastern Sugarloaf Township. There are two small lakes in the watershed of the stream. One is located in the watershed's middle reaches and one is located in its upper reaches.

History and etymology
Ashelman Run was entered into the Geographic Names Information System on August 2, 1979. Its identifier in the Geographic Names Information System is  1168447.

Ashelman Run is named after Daniel Ashelman. Ashelman most likely moved from the Wyoming Flats to a location near the stream in the early 1800s. He also constructed a log cabin close to the stream. The land near it was still owned by the Ashelman family as late as 1982.

Biology
Wild trout naturally reproduce in Ashelman Run between its headwaters and its mouth. The stream is designated as a Coldwater Fishery.

See also
Fallow Hollow, next tributary of Coles Creek going downstream
List of tributaries of Fishing Creek (North Branch Susquehanna River)

References

Rivers of Columbia County, Pennsylvania
Tributaries of Fishing Creek (North Branch Susquehanna River)
Rivers of Pennsylvania